The High Commissioner of the United Kingdom to Cyprus is the United Kingdom's foremost diplomatic representative in the Republic of Cyprus.

Previously a territory of the Ottoman Empire, a British protectorate under Ottoman suzerainty was established over Cyprus by the Cyprus Convention of 4 June 1878. The United Kingdom declared war on the Ottoman Empire on 5 November 1914 and annexed Cyprus. Turkey recognised British possession of Cyprus by the Treaty of Lausanne on 24 July 1923 and the island became a Crown colony on 10 March 1925. Following the Zürich and London Agreement of 19 February 1959, Cyprus became independent on 16 August 1960. The Republic of Cyprus is a member of the British Commonwealth, so the British diplomatic representative is a High Commissioner.

Heads of mission

High Commissioners (1878–1925)
1878–1879: Sir Garnet Wolseley
1879–1886: Sir Robert Biddulph
1886–1892: Sir Henry Ernest Bulwer
1892–1898: Sir Walter Sendall
1898–1904: Sir William Haynes Smith
1904–1911: Sir Charles King-Harman 
1911–1915: Hamilton Goold-Adams
1915–1918: Sir John Clauson (died in office)
1918–1920: Sir Malcolm Stevenson (acting)
1920–1925: Sir Malcolm Stevenson

Governors (1925–1960)
1925–1926: Sir Malcolm Stevenson
1926–1932: Sir Ronald Storrs
1932–1933: Sir Reginald Stubbs 
1933–1939: Sir Richmond Palmer
1939–1941: William Battershill
1941–1946: Charles Woolley
1946–1949: Reginald Fletcher, 1st Baron Winster
1949–1954: Sir Andrew Wright
1954–1955: Sir Robert Armitage
1955–1957: Sir John Harding
1957–1960: Sir Hugh Foot

High Commissioners (1960–present)
1961–1964: Sir Arthur Clark
1964–1965: Sir Alec Bishop
1965–1967: Sir David Hunt
1967–1969: Sir Norman Costar
1969–1971: Peter Ramsbotham
1971–1972: Robert Edmonds
1973–1975: Stephen Olver
1975–1979: Donald Gordon
1979–1982: Peregrine Rhodes
1982–1988: William Wilberforce
1988–1990: Humphrey Maud
1990–1994: David Dain
1994–1999: David Madden
1999–2001: Edward Clay
2001–2005: Lyn Parker
2005–2010: Peter Millett
2010–2014: Matthew Kidd
2014–2016: Ric Todd
2016–2018: Matthew Kidd

2018–2022: Stephen Lillie
2022–: Irfan Siddiq

References

External links
UK and Cyprus, gov.uk

Cyprus
 
United Kingdom High Commissioners
United Kingdom High Commissioners